The 3rd Jussi Awards ceremony, presented by Elokuvajournalistit ry, honored the best Finnish films released between October 1, 1945 and July 31, 1946 and took place on November 1, 1946 at Restaurant Fennia in Helsinki. The Jussi Awards were presented in seven different categories, including Best Cinematography, Best Production Design, Best Actor, Best Actress, Best Supporting Actor, Best Supporting Actress, and Best Short Film. Additionally, a Special Jussi Award was given out for a young actor, and three Honorable Mentions were included at the ceremony.

Awards

Jussi

Special Jussi

Honorable Mention

References

External links
  

Jussi Awards